Round Hill Music is an American music publishing company founded in 2010 by Josh Gruss, Richard Rowe, and Neil Gillis.  The company runs a music publishing division, a sync and royalty administration, a music production library business, a record label and label services division, and also a Nashville songwriter services group with offices in New York, Los Angeles, Nashville and London.

Divisions

Music publishing
In January 2012, Round Hill and Adage Classics jointly acquired the GIL Music and GPS Music catalogs, which included the North American rights to six Beatles songs ("She Loves You," "I Saw Her Standing There", "From Me to You," "Misery," "I Wanna Be Your Man" and "There's a Place"). 
In September 2017, Round Hill made its largest acquisition to date, paying $250 million for the Carlin America publisher. Carlin owned the rights to songs recorded by Elvis Presley, among other artists. 

In 2017, Round Hill entered into a partnership with Zync for synchronization.

In August 2019, Round Hill signed a sub-publishing deal with Warner/Chappell Music, which will represent Round Hill's catalogue outside of the United States, Canada, the United Kingdom, Ireland, and the Nordics. 

Round Hill also has signed and acquired the catalogues of Skid Row, KK Downing (Judas Priest), Jani Lane (Warrant), Triumph, Tesla, Craig David, Ronnie James Dio, Neil Sedaka, John Rzeznik of the Goo Goo Dolls, Billy Duffy (The Cult), Jim Vallance, Big Loud Shirt, Ashley Gorley, Arthouse Entertainment, Keith Sweat, Rob Thomas, Collective Soul, Josh Kear, Big Tractor, Lit, and Eric Carmen.

Round Hill Records
In 2014, Round Hill Records was established with the catalog acquisition of the UK rock band, Bush, in partnership with frontman Gavin Rossdale.

In January 2016, Round Hill paid $35 million for the entire song publishing catalogue of American rock band The Offspring, as well as the band's Columbia Records recordings. Today Round Hill Records is releasing records from artists such as Royal Teeth and The London Souls, as well as providing label services to many other artists.

In 2020, Round Hill Records created a rock dedicated label called Black Hill Records, which has signed artists including The Cult, Black Pistol Fire, and Jared James Nichols.

In May 2021, Round Hill acquired the catalogue of the Swedish label Telegram Studios, including Dolores Recordings and Woah Dad.

Round Hill Music Royalty Fund
Round Hill Music Royalty Partners is the private equity arm of Round Hill Music which is dedicated to acquiring copyrights of music.

It raised its first Fund in 2014 with $202 million and its second fund with $263 million in 2017.

Copyright lawsuits 
In 2014, Round Hill Music and BMG Rights Management sued Cox Communications for the copyright infringements of its subscribers.  In December 2015, the case was decided in BMG and Round Hill Music's favor.

On July 31, 2020, Round Hill filed a $32.8 million lawsuit against the independent distributor Tunecore and its parent company, Believe Digital, citing the unauthorized distribution of 219 Round Hill compositions.  Round Hill is seeking $150,000 per infringed composition.

See also 
 List of record labels

References

External links
 Official website

American record labels
Music publishing companies of the United States